J. Nicholas Mandziuk (December 13, 1902 – September 7, 1969) was a Canadian politician in Manitoba. He represented the electoral district of Marquette in the House of Commons of Canada from 1957 to 1968.

He was a member of the Progressive Conservative Party.

External links

1902 births
1969 deaths
Members of the House of Commons of Canada from Manitoba
Progressive Conservative Party of Canada MPs
Ukrainian emigrants to Canada